Cynthia MacGregor (March 26, 1964 – February 13, 1996) was a professional tennis player from the United States.

Biography
MacGregor, who was known as "Cinny", was born in Torrance, California.

From 1983 to 1986, she played collegiate tennis at San Diego State University, where she was a five time All-American.

She competed on the professional tour mostly as a doubles player, reaching 50 in the world. In doubles she often partnered with younger sister Cammy MacGregor and the pair made four WTA Tour finals together, including a title win in Taipei in 1987. Her most notable performance in singles was a second round appearance at the 1988 Australian Open, where after beating Patricia Hy in the first round, she lost in the second round to eventual quarter-finalist Claudia Porwik, 11–13 in the deciding set. At the 1990 Australian Open, she teamed up with her sister to make the quarter-finalists of the women's doubles.

In 1996, she died of complications relating to anorexia nervosa, aged 31.

WTA Tour finals

Doubles (1-3)

References

External links
 
 

1964 births
1996 deaths
American female tennis players
Tennis people from California
Sportspeople from Torrance, California
San Diego State Aztecs women's tennis players
Deaths from anorexia nervosa
Neurological disease deaths in California
20th-century American women
20th-century American people